Eoin Guinan (born 4 February 1986) is an Irish hurler who plays for Western Australian club Sarsfields. He began his career with St. Lachtain's and is a former member of the Kilkenny senior hurling team.

Career

Born in Freshford, County Kilkenny, Guinan first came to prominence with the St Lachtain's club that won championship titles in various grades of Gaelic football. He later captained the St Lachtain's intermediate hurling team to the 2010 All-Ireland Club Championship title. Guinan first appeared on the inter-county scene as a member of the Kilkenny minor team that won the All-Ireland Championship title in 2003. He later won consecutive Leinster Under-21 Championship titles with the under-21 team. Guinan was drafted onto the Kilkenny senior hurling team for the 2009 Walsh Cup and was a member of the extended panel for much of the following three seasons.

Career statistics

Honours

St Lachtain's
All-Ireland Intermediate Club Hurling Championship: 2010
Leinster Intermediate Club Hurling Championship: 2009
Kilkenny Intermediate Hurling Championship: 2009

Kilkenny
Leinster Senior Hurling Championship: 2010
Walsh Cup: 2009
Leinster Under-21 Hurling Championship: 2005, 2006
All-Ireland Minor Hurling Championship: 2003
Leinster Minor Hurling Championship: 2003, 2004

References

1986 births
Living people
Irish bricklayers
Irish expatriates in Australia
Kilkenny inter-county hurlers
St Lachtain's hurlers